Salesi Fili Finau (born Neiafu, 4 January 1972) is a former Tongan-born Australian rugby union player who played as flanker.

Career
Born in the island of Vava'u and educated at the Homebush Boys High School, Finau first played for West Harbour RFC in 1990, before his debut for the New South Wales representative team, which was during a match against the ACT Kookaburras played in Canberra, in 1993. He also played two seasons for the Waratahs in the Super 12.

International career
At international level, Finau debuted for the Australia Schoolboys XV which was touring in Britain and Europe in 1990. 
His debut for the Wallabies was during the 1993 end of the year Australia tours in North America and Europe, although he played five uncapped matches for an Australian XV. His only test cap for Australia was during the third Bledisloe Cup test against the All Blacks in Dunedin, on 16 August 1997, replacing the injured flankers Matt Cockbain and Daniel Manu as blindside flanker.

References

External links
 Fili Finau international statistics at ESPN Scrum
 Fili Finau profile at Itsrugby
 Salesi Fili Finau profile at Rugby Australia 
 Salesi Finau at New Zealand Rugby History

1972 births
Living people
Australian rugby union players
Australia international rugby union players
People from Vavaʻu
Rugby union flankers
New South Wales Waratahs players
Tongan emigrants to Australia